The 2019–20 Purdue Fort Wayne Mastodons men's basketball team represented Purdue University Fort Wayne in the 2019–20 NCAA Division I men's basketball season. The Mastodons, led by sixth-year head coach Jon Coffman, split their home games between the Gates Sports Center and the Allen County War Memorial Coliseum, both in Fort Wayne, Indiana, as members of the Summit League. They finished the season 14–19, 6–10 in Summit League play to finish in seventh place. They defeated South Dakota State in the quarterfinals of the Summit League tournament before losing in the semifinals to North Dakota.

This was the Mastodons' final season in the Summit League; the school joined the Horizon League on July 1, 2020.

Previous season
The Mastodons finished the 2018–19 season 18–15 overall, 9–7 in Summit League play, to finish in a tie for 3rd place. In the Summit League tournament, they defeated South Dakota in the quarterfinals, before falling to Omaha in the semifinals.

Roster

Schedule and results

|-
!colspan=12 style=| Non-conference regular season

|-
!colspan=9 style=| Summit League regular season

|-
!colspan=12 style=| Summit League tournament
|-

|-

Source

References

Purdue Fort Wayne Mastodons men's basketball seasons
Purdue Fort Wayne Mastodons
Purdue Fort Wayne Mastodons men's basketball
Purdue Fort Wayne Mastodons men's basketball